Events from the year 1548 in art.

Events

Works

Painting
 Girolamo Siciolante da Sermoneta – Madonna with Six Saints (for San Martino (Bologna))
 Frans Floris – The Judgement of Paris (approximate date)
 Tintoretto
 Miracle of the Slave
 St Mark's Body Brought to Venice
 Titian
 Equestrian Portrait of Charles V
 Venus with Organist and Cupid
 Caterina van Hemessen
 Portrait of a Woman (Rijksmuseum)
 Self-portrait
 Young girl
 Jan Sanders van Hemessen – The Calling of Saint Matthew
 Daniele da Volterra – Madonna with Child, young Saint John the Baptist and Saint Barbara (approximate date)

Sculpture
Pierino da Vinci - Young River God with Theee Putti

Publications
Paolo Pino - Dialogo di pittura

Births
March 18 - Cornelis Ketel, Dutch Mannerist painter (died 1616)
May - Karel van Mander, Flemish painter, poet and biographer (died 1606)
August 26 - Bernardino Poccetti, Italian Mannerist painter and printmaker (died 1612)
date unknown 
Ippolito Andreasi, Italian painter (died 1608)
Pietro Francavilla, Franco-Flemish sculptor (died 1615) 
probable
Peter Candid, Dutch painter and architect (died 1628)
1548/1550: Palma il Giovane, Italian Mannerist painter from Venice (died 1628)

Deaths
June 11 – Agostino Busti, Italian High Renaissance sculptor (born 1483)
November 10 – Giovanni Battista Averara, Italian painter (born 1508)
date unknown
Matthys Cock, Flemish landscape painter (born 1505)
Battista Dossi, Italian painter who belonged to the Ferrara School of Painting (born 1490)
Martin Schaffner, German painter and medallist (born 1478)
probable
Jean Mone, German-Flemish sculptor (born 1500)
Matteo dal Nasaro Veronese, Italian sculptor and engraver (born unknown)
Girolamo Savoldo, Italian High Renaissance painter (born 1480/1485)

References

 
Years of the 16th century in art